Brian Kim may refer to:

 Brian Kim (hedge fund manager), an American hedge fund manager
 Kim Beom-soo (businessman), also known as Brian Kim, a Korean entrepreneur and founder of Kakao